= Hin Heup massacre =

- Part of Laotian Civil War
- Location: Hin Heup bridge, Laos
- Date: 29 May 1975
- Target: Hmong civilians
- Attack type: Massacre
- Weapons: Mortars, M16s, and bayonets
- Deaths: 14
- Injuries: 100+
- Victim: Hmong civilians
- Perpetrator: Pathet Lao

The Hin Heup massacre was the massacre of 14 Hmong civilians at Hin Heup bridge by Pathet Lao troops.

== Massacre ==
On 29 May 1975, about 10,000 Hmong people, attempted to cross Hin Heup bridge traveling to Vientiane. As the group crossed the bridge Pathet Lao forces open fire on the column using mortars, M16s, and bayonets. Many people jumped into the river to flee the firing troops, by the end of the massacre 14 civilians were killed and over 100 wounded.
